The International Federation of Magic Societies (FISM) (Fédération Internationale des Sociétés Magiques) was founded on September 5th,1948 and is one of the most respected organizations in the magic community. It is an international body coordinating dozens of national and international clubs and federations around the world. Together these clubs represent approximately 80,000 magicians from 50 countries and 110 member organizations as of 2022. The organization hosts a self-named "FISM" conference every three years, where magicians compete for "Best of" categories. The most recent FISM was in 2022, held in Quebec City, Canada. 
Founded in 1948, it is one of the most recognized magic organizations in the magic circle. The FISM organizes a worldwide magic convention every three years. The member organizations fight for the right to host. Top magicians from all over the world will compete for the title of "World Magic Champion". Prior to this, various regions will hold regional selections. FISM Europe, FISM Asia, FISM North America, FISM Latin America, FISM Africa, FISM Oceania, and member organizations have the quotas recommended by their regional selection committees.

History 

The roots of the FISM began in Paris, France, in 1937, at a meeting of the 34-year-old ASAP, Association Syndicale des Artistes Prestidigitateurs (Association of prestidigitation artists), which had a monthly magazine Le Journal de la Prestidigitation. The group's vice-president, Dr. Jules Dhotel, wanted the ASAP to produce an international convention in Paris in October 1939, and then proceed to have the convention in a different country each year. Plans proceeded, but when the Nazis invaded Poland in September 1939, the convention was cancelled. After World War II, progress resumed. In 1946, a hotel in Amsterdam, the Netherlands, hosted an International Congress of Magicians, with over 300 registrants from around Europe. There were lectures, exhibits of antique books and apparatus, tours of Amsterdam, a public show, and a contest in which 20 magicians took part. There were no categories, so only one set of awards. First prize went to amateur French magician Jean Valton, for an exceptional routine of card juggling and manipulation; second went to Scotland's amateur magician John Ramsay, and third to a professional husband-wife duo, De Flezkis, who combined magic and dance.

The 1947 "Congrès Magique International" brought in 500 attendees from 18 countries, and 70 participants in the competition. Meetings at that convention were held to discuss the creation of a formal international organization, and that was where the FISM title was proposed. While details were worked out, the "Congrès" conventions continued annually.

Mission 

FISM's stated aim is to create a centralized "voice" for the magic world and to help develop, elevate, and promote the art of magic. It coordinates activities of member societies and encourages communication between them, as well as the exchange of services. It has a corporate identity and a team of professional marketers. It also serves a capacity in the realm of intellectual property, fighting against the copying or inappropriate release of magical inventions or routines.

Board of Directors 
The International President and two International Vice Presidents constitute the BOARD OF DIRECTORS.

At the General Assembly in Quebec City FISM WCM 2022 was elected the new BoD:

 FISM International President: Andrea Baioni
 FISM International Vice President (General Affairs): Satoru Yamamoto
 FISM International Vice President (Finance): Peter Din

Convention 
The FISM is probably best known for conducting one of the premier magic conventions in the world, the triennial "World Championship of Magic" (WCM). 

Fred Kaps is the only three-time winner of the grand prize (1950, 1955, 1961).

The 2000 convention was held in Lisbon, Portugal, where the Grand-Prix award in stage magic was won by Scott & Muriel from Netherlands.

The 2003 convention was held in The Hague, Netherlands, where the Grand-Prix award in close-up magic was won by Jason Latimer from the US, and the Grand Prix award in the stage magic division was won by Norbert Ferré from France.

The 2006 convention was held in Stockholm, Sweden, where the Grand-Prix award in close-up magic was won by Rick Merrill from the US, and the Grand Prix award in the stage magic division was won by Pilou from France.

The 2009 convention was held in Beijing, China, where the Grand-Prix award in close-up magic was won by Shawn Farquhar from Canada, and the Grand Prix award in the stage magic division was won by Soma from Hungary.

FISM WCM 2012 was held in Blackpool, England: Grand Prix Stage: Yu Ho Jin (South Korea) - Grand Prix Close-up: Yann Frisch (France)

FISM WCM 2015 was held in Rimini, Italy, where the Grand Prix award in Stage was won by Hector Mancha (Spain) and Grand Prix Close-up was won by Pierric (Switzerland)

FISM WCM 2018 was held in Busan, South Korea, Grand Prix Stage: Miguel Muñoz (Spain), Grand Prix Close-up: Eric Chien (Taiwan)

FISM WCM 2022 was held in Quebec City, Canada, where the Grand Prix awards were won by Laurent Piron and Simon Coronel

Winners 
2022
 Grand Prix Stage: Laurent Piron (Belgium)
 Grand Prix Close-up: Simon Coronel (USA)
 Manipulation: Tie: Artem Shchukin (Russia), Junwoo Park (Korea)
 General Magic: Laurent Piron (Belgium)
 Invention Award Stage: Tie: Zhu Mingzhu (China), HJ (Taiwan), Ramó & Alegría (Spain)
 Invention Award Close-up: Tie: Martin Eisele (Germany), Daniel Mormina (Argentina)
 Micromagic: Tie: Simon Coronel (USA), Luis Olmedo (Spain)
 Card magic: Markobi (France)
 Parlour: Shoot Ogawa (USA)
 Stage Illusions: Yunke (Spain)
 Mentalism: Anca & Lucca (Austria)
 Most Original Close-up Act: Gleb (Lithuania)
 Most Original Stage Act: Ding Yang (China)
 Comedy Magic: Mortenn Christiansen (Denmark)
 Special awards:
 Creativity & Artistic Vision: Topas (Germany)
 History & Research: Richard Kaufman (USA)
 Theory & Philosophy: Dani DaOrtiz (Spain)

2018
 Grand Prix Stage: Miguel Muñoz (Spain)
 Grand Prix Close-up: Eric Chien (Taiwan)
 Manipulation: Tie: Ha Lim An (Korea), Florian Sainvet (France)
 General Magic: Miguel Muñoz (Spain)
 Invention: Tie: Javier Botia (Spain), Han Manho (Korea)
 Micromagic: Eric Chien (Taiwan)
 Card magic: Bill Cheung (China)
 Parlour: Marc Weide (Germany)
 Stage Illusions: (no winner)
 Mentalism: Javier Botia (Spain)
 Most Original Close-up Act: DK (Korea)
 Most Original Stage Act: Sangsoon Kim (Korea)
 Comedy Magic: (no winner)
 Special awards:
 Creativity & Artistic Vision: Derek DelGaudio (USA)
 History & Research: Stephen Minch (USA)
 Theory & Philosophy: Jeff McBride (USA)

2015
 Grand Prix Stage: Héctor Mancha (Spain)
 Grand Prix Close-up: Pierric (Switzerland)
 Manipulation: Héctor Mancha (Spain)
 General Magic: Young-Min Kim (Korea)
 Invention: Tie: Daniel Collado (Spain), Antonio Romero (Spain), Semba (Argentina)
 Micromagic: (no winner)
 Card magic: Tie: Horret Wu (Taiwan), Shin Lim (Canada)
 Parlour: Pierric (Switzerland)
 Stage Illusions: (no winner)
 Mentalism: Thommy Ten & Amelie (Austria)
 Most Original Close-up Act: DK (Korea)
 Most Original Stage Act: Yann Frisch (France)
 Comedy Magic: (no winner)
 Special awards:
 History & Research & Scholarship: Magic Christian (Austria)

2012
 Grand Prix Stage: Yu Ho Jin (South Korea)
 Grand Prix Close-up: Yann Frisch (France)
 Manipulation: Yu Ho Jin (Korea)
 General Magic: Marko Karvo (Finland)
 Invention Award Close-up: Tango (Argentina)
 Invention Award Stage: Haon Gun (Korea)
 Micromagic: Andost (USA)
 Cards: Jan Logemann (Germany)
 Parlour: Yann Frisch (France)
 Illusions: Marcel Prince of Illusions (Netherlands)
 Mentalism: (no winner this year)
 Most Original Close-up Act: Simon Coronel (Australia)
 Most Original Stage Act: Ted Kim (South Korea)
 Comedy Magic: Doble Mandoble (Belgium)
 Special awards:
 Creativity & Artistic Vision: Teller (USA)
 History & Research: Mike Caveney (USA)
 Theory & Philosophy: Eugene Burger (USA)

2009
 Grand Prix Stage: Soma (Hungary)
 Grand Prix Close-up: Shawn Farquhar (Canada)
 Manipulation (tie for first place): Yo Kato (Japan) and Han Seoi-Hui (Republic of Korea)
 General Magic: Soma (Hungary)
 Invention: Jorge Luengo (Spain)
 Micromagic: (no winner this year)
 Cards: Shawn Farquhar (Canada)
 Parlour Magic: Marc Oberon (England)
 Stage Illusions: Julius Frack (Germany)
 Mentalism: (no winner this year)
 Most Original Act: Charming Choi (Republic of Korea)
 Comedy: (no winner this year)

2006
 Grand Prix Stage: Pilou (France)
 Grand Prix Close-up: Rick Merrill (USA)
 Manipulation: Dai Bin Chun (China)
 General Magic: Lee Eun-gyeol (Republic of Korea)
 Invention Close-up: Mathieu Bich (France)
 Invention Close-up: Pierric (Switzerland)
 Invention Stage: Mickael & Bethy Ross (France)
 Invention Stage: Cesaral Magic (Spain)
 Micromagic: Martin Eisele (Germany)
 Close-up Card: Helder Guimaraes (Portugal)
 Parlour Magic: Gaston (Germany)
 Stage Illusions: Sittah (The Netherlands)
 Mentalism: (no winner this year)
 Most Original Act Stage: Hugo Valenzuela (Argentina)
 Most Original Act Close-up: Rocco (USA)
 Comedy: Die Zauderer (Germany)
 Comedy: Mikael Szanyiel (France)
 Comedy: Rick Merrill (USA)
 Comedy: Stonkel (Germany)

2003
 Grand Prix Stage: Norbert Ferré (France)
 Grand Prix Close-up: Jason Latimer (USA)

2000
 Grand Prix: Scott the Magician & Muriel (The Netherlands)

1997
 Grand Prix: Ivan Necheporenko	(Russia)

1994
 Grand Prix: Franklin (Germany)
1991
 Grand Prix: Vladimir Danilin	(Russia)
1988
 Grand Prix: Johnny Ace Palmer	(USA)
1985
 Grand Prix: Javier & Ana	(Spain)
1982
 Grand Prix: Lance Burton	(USA)
1979
 Grand Prix: tie: Ger Copper (The Netherlands), Sultangali Shukurov & Sara Kabigujina (Russia)
1976
 Grand Prix: Pierre Brahma (France)
1973
 Grand Prix: Richard Ross	(The Netherlands)
1970
 Grand Prix: Richard Ross	(The Netherlands)
1967
 Grand Prix: Di Sato (Harry Thiery) (The Netherlands)
1964
 Grand Prix: tie: Mr Cox	(Germany), Pierre Brahma	(France)
1961
 Grand Prix: Fred Kaps	(The Netherlands)

Member organizations 

Member Societies are organizationally grouped into six Continental Divisions.
Academi of Magicians
Academy of Magical Arts
Belgium Magic Federation
Canadian Association of Magicians
Club de Magie du Québec
College of Magic
French Federation of Conjurers
International Brotherhood of Magicians
Krajowi Klub Iluzjoniztow
Macao Magic Artist Society
Magician Association of Hong Kong
Magicians Association of Korea
Magischer Zirkel von Deutschland
Magisk Cirkel Danmark
Maigsk Cirkel Norge
Nederlandse Magische Unie
Red de Magos Solidarios
Serbia Magic Ring
Society of American Magicians
Swedish Magic Circle Society
The British Ring
The Magic Circle
Vietnam Magicians Association
West Australian Society of Magicians

References

External links

 "A history of FISM", by Max Maven
 Vienna 2009 Candidate City for the 24th FISM World Championships of Magic
 Granada 2009 Candidate City for the 24th FISM World Championships of Magic
 List of FISM World Championship winners
 FISM 2009 World Championships of Magic

Magic conventions
Magic organizations
Organizations established in 1948
World championships
Performing arts contests